Arina Vadimovna Ushakova (born 27 June 2002) is a Russian competitive ice dancer. With her skating partner, Maxim Nekrasov, she is the 2018 World Junior bronze medalist and 2018–19 Junior Grand Prix Final silver medalist. She has also won six medals on the ISU Junior Grand Prix series, including gold medals in 2017 Italy, 2018 Lithuania and 2018 Armenia.

Personal life 
Arina Vadimovna Ushakova was born on 27 June 2002 in Chelyabinsk, Russia.

Career

Early career 
Ushakova began learning to skate in 2005. She trained as a single skater in Chelyabinsk until 2014; she then moved to Moscow and switched to ice dancing. She competed with her first partner, Anton Spiridonov, during the 2014–2015 season. She then teamed up with Maxim Nekrasov. They are coached by Alexei Gorshkov and Maxim Bolotin.

2016–2017 season 
Ushakova/Nekrasov received their first ISU Junior Grand Prix (JGP) assignments in the 2016–2017 season. They won bronze medals at both events, competing in late August in Ostrava, Czech Republic and in October in Dresden, Germany. 

In November 2016 they won the silver medal at the 2016 Ice Star. They placed seventh at the 2017 Russian Junior Championships.

2017–2018 season 
Competing in the 2017 JGP series, Ushakova/Nekrasov took bronze in August in Minsk, Belarus. They won their first JGP gold medal in October at the event in Egna, Italy, beating the silver medalists, their teammates Polishchuk/Vakhnov, by about two points. With these results they qualified for the 2017–18 JGP Final, where they placed fifth.

In January 2018, Ushakova/Nekrasov took the bronze medal at the 2018 Russian Junior Championships after placing fifth in the short dance and third in the free dance. In March, they won bronze at the 2018 World Junior Championships in Sofia, Bulgaria, having placed third in both segments.

2018–2019 season 
Ushakova/Nekrasov started their season by competing in the 2018 JGP series. At their first JGP event of the season they won the gold medal in Kaunas, Lithuania. They were ranked first in both the rhythm dance and the free dance and won the gold medal by a margin of more than 6 points over the silver medalists, Nguyen/Kolesnik. Their rhythm dance, free dance and combined total scores at that competition were the highest scores achieved in an international junior ice dance competition at the time, though since surpassed.

At their second JGP event of the season they won another gold medal, now in Yerevan, Armenia. Again they were ranked first in both the short program and the free skate. Ushakova/Nekrasov also upgraded their earlier short program, free skate and combined total World record scores. With two JGP gold medals they qualified for the 2018–19 Junior Grand Prix Final.  At the Final Ushakova/Nekrasov won the silver medal after placing second in the rhythm dance and first in the free dance. They were part of a Russian sweep of the ice dance's podium. Ushakova/Nekrasov beat the bronze medalists, Khudaiberdieva/Nazarov, by about 6 points but the race for the gold medal were extremely tight. The gold medalists, Shevchenko/Eremenko, beat Ushakova/Nekrasov by a margin of only 0.01 point.

Following the Final, Ushakova/Nekrasov were again defeated by Shevchenko/Eremenko at the 2019 Russian Junior Championships, winning the silver medal after second-place finishes in both segments.  In late February they won the 2019 Open Ice Mall Cup.  

Their final event of the season was the 2019 World Junior Championships, where they unexpectedly placed fourth in the rhythm dance after hitting only two of the eight keypoints on the tango pattern dance.  They dropped to fifth place overall after placing fifth in the free dance.

2019–2020 season 
Ushakova/Nekrasov missed the first half of the season, including the Junior Grand Prix, due to Nekrasov undergoing and recovering from leg surgery.  They returned to competition with a victory at the Golden Spin of Zagreb, and then competed at the Russian Junior Championships, where they placed second behind Shanaeva/Naryzhnyy.  Their silver medal at junior nationals led to their being assigned to compete at the 2020 World Junior Championships in Tallinn, Estonia.  They placed fourth in the rhythm dance there, hitting only three of the eight keypoints on the Teatime Foxtrot pattern dance.  Fourth in the free dance as well, they finished fourth overall.

2020–2021 season 
With the COVID-19 pandemic resulting in the cancellation of the international junior season, Ushakova/Nekrasov competed exclusively domestically. In their final junior event, they won the gold medal at the 2021 Russian Junior Championships.

2021–2022 season 
Ushakova and Nekrasov moved to the senior level. They withdrew from the Russian test skates, citing medical reasons. It was subsequently reported that Ushakova had contracted COVID-19.

Appearing at their first senior Russian championships, Ushakova/Nekrasov placed seventh.

Programs 
(with Nekrasov)

Records and achievements 
(with Nekrasov)
 
 Set the junior-level ice dancing record of the new +5 / -5 GOE (Grade of Execution) system for the combined total (168.17 points), rhythm dance (67.63 points) and free dance (100.54 points) at the 2018 JGP Lithuania.

 They became the first junior team to score above 100 points in the free dance at the 2018 JGP Lithuania.

 Upgraded their junior-level ice dancing record for the combined total (172.81 points), rhythm dance (69.18 points) and free dance (103.63 points) at the 2018 JGP Armenia.

 They became the first junior team to score above 170 points at the 2018 JGP Armenia.

Competitive highlights 
JGP: Junior Grand Prix

With Nekrasov

Detailed results 
Small medals for short and free programs awarded only at ISU Championships.

With Nekrasov

References

External links 
 
 

! colspan="3" style="border-top: 5px solid #78FF78;" |World Junior Record Holders

2002 births
Russian female ice dancers
World Junior Figure Skating Championships medalists
Living people
Sportspeople from Chelyabinsk